Paul Kendrick (born in 1983) is an author of popular history.

Early life and education 
Kendrick obtained a bachelor's and a master's degree from the Columbian College of Arts and Sciences at George Washington University (GW).

During his time at GW, Kendrick served as President of the college's National Association for the Advancement of Colored People chapter and also as a Presidential Administrative Fellow.

Career 
With his father, Stephen Kendrick, Kendrick co-authored Sarah's Long Walk: The Free Blacks of Boston and How Their Struggle for Equality Changed America, which describes the legal case, Roberts v. Boston, brought on behalf of Sarah Roberts, a black child who was not allowed to attend any of the five "whites-only" schools she passed on her daily walks to school, and the effect this had on the effort to desegregate Boston schools in the 1840s. The case led to the Separate but equal justification for segregation. The book was named among the best non-fiction of 2005 by the Christian Science Monitor.

He has also co-authored (with his father) Douglass and Lincoln: How a Revolutionary Black Leader and a Reluctant Liberator Struggled to End Slavery and Save the Union, to be published in December 2007.

He is currently director of the Harlem Children's Zone's College Success Program.

Publications
Sarah's Long Walk: The Free Blacks of Boston and How Their Struggle for Equality Changed America by Paul Kendrick & Stephen Kendrick. Beacon Press: Boston (2004). 
Douglass and Lincoln: How a Revolutionary Black Leader and a Reluctant Liberator Struggled to End Slavery and Save the Union by Paul Kendrick & Stephen Kendrick. Walker & Company: New York (2007). 
Nine Days: The Race to Save Martin Luther King Jr.'s Life and Win the 1960 Election by Paul Kendrick & Stephen Kendrick. Farrar, Straus and Giroux: New York (2021).

References

21st-century American historians
21st-century American male writers
Historians of the United States
Activists for African-American civil rights
Living people
1983 births
Columbian College of Arts and Sciences alumni
American male non-fiction writers